= Selden Standard =

Restaurant in Detroit, Michigan, U.S.

- Interactive map of Selden Standard

Restaurant information
- Food type: American
- Location: 3921 2nd Avenue, Detroit, Michigan, 48201, United States
- Coordinates: 42°20′52″N 83°3′54″W

Selden Standard is a restaurant in Detroit, Michigan. It serves an American cuisine, and was a semifinalist in the Outstanding Restaurant category of the James Beard Foundation Awards in 2024.
